Margaret McIver (9 May 1879 – 1958) was the founder of the Glasgow Barras, a street market in the Calton area, in the east end of Glasgow. Initially an area of street markets, it became a  permanent site when a roof was added to protect the stalls from bad weather and it now has over a thousand stalls within 10 markets. It is also the location of the Barrowland Ballroom, one of the city's main rock and pop venues.

Early life 
Maggie McIver, also known as "The Barras Queen", was born Margaret Russell in Bridgeton, Glasgow, on 9 May 1879. Her father, Alexander Russell, was a policeman  and her mother, Margaret Hutcheson, was a French polisher. Before opening her own fruit shop, Maggie worked as a French polisher just like her mother. She met her husband James McIver at the fruit market and they set up their own business hiring out horses and carts to local hawkers.

The Barras 

McIver hired over 300 barrows to local hawkers in her yard in Marshall Lane. This was in response to the Local Corporation wishing to stop local street traders and the street traders being charged by the police. In 1926, Maggie McIver decided to cover the market mainly to protect clothing hawkers from having their stock ruined. The market was fully enclosed two years later.

The Barrowlands 

It was common practice for McIver to host a Christmas party for the hawkers and their families in a local hall. One year, when McIver was unable to hire the hall, she decided to build her own, the famous Barrowland Ballrooms which opened Christmas Eve 1934.

Commemoration 
A plaque has been added to the Barrowlands Ballroom to commemorate Maggie McIver as part of twelve Scots being honoured by Historic Environment Scotland (HES). There is also a commemorative stone carving at one of the gate entrances to Glasgow Green.

References 

1879 births
1958 deaths
Businesspeople from Glasgow
Scottish businesspeople
Glasgow Green
People from Bridgeton, Glasgow
19th-century Scottish women
20th-century Scottish women